Homeobox protein aristaless-like 4 is a protein that in humans is encoded by the ALX4 gene. Alx4 belongs to the group-1 aristaless-related genes, a majority of which are linked to the development of the craniofacial and/or appendicular skeleton, along with PRRX1, SHOX, ALX3, and CART1. The Alx4 protein acts as a transcriptional activator and is predominantly expressed in the mesenchyme of the developing embryonic limb buds. Transcripts of this gene are detectable in the lateral plate mesoderm just prior to limb induction. Alx4 expression plays a major role in the determination of spatial orientation of the growing limb bud by aiding in the establishment of anteroposterior polarity of the limb. It does this by working in conjunction with Gli3 and dHand to restrict the expression of Sonic Hedgehog (SHh) to the posterior mesenchyme, which will eventually give rise to the Zone of Polarizing Activity (ZPA). This gene has been proven to be allelic with mutations and deletions giving rise to a host of craniofacial dismorphologies and several forms of polydactyly in mammalian development. A mouse-model knockout of this gene, dubbed Strong's luxoid, was originally created by Forstheofel in the 1960s and has been extensively studied to understand the partial and complete loss-of-function properties of this gene.

Interactions 

ALX4 has been shown to interact with Lymphoid enhancer-binding factor 1.

References

Further reading

External links 
  GeneReviews/NCBI/NIH/UW entry on Enlarged Parietal Foramina/Cranium Bifidum